The 1973 WTA Tour was composed of the third annual Virginia Slims Circuit and Commercial Union Assurance Grand Prix, a tour of tennis tournaments for female tennis players, sponsored by Virginia Slims cigarettes. It was also the year that the WTA Tour was officially formed by Billie Jean King following a meeting held in the Gloucester Hotel in London during the week before Wimbledon.

Schedule
This is a calendar of all events sponsored by Virginia Slims in the year 1973, with player progression documented from the quarterfinals stage. The table also includes the Grand Slam tournaments, the 1973 Virginia Slims Championships and the 1973 Federation Cup.

Key

December (1972)

January

February

March

April

May

June

July

August

September

October

November

Grand Prix points system
The Grand Prix tournaments were divided into four groups. Group AA consisted of the Triple Crown – the French Open, the Wimbledon Championships and the US Open – while the other tournaments were divided into Groups A, B and C by prize money and draw size. Points were allocated based on these groups and the finishing position of a player in a tournament. No points were awarded to first round losers and ties were settled by the number of tournaments played. The points allocation is listed below:

Statistical information
These tables present the number of singles (S), doubles (D), and mixed doubles (X) titles won by each player and each nation during the 1973 Virginia Slims Circuit. They also include data for the Grand Slam tournaments and the year-end championships. The table is sorted by:

 total number of titles (a doubles title won by two players representing the same nation counts as only one win for the nation);
 highest amount of highest category tournaments (for example, having a single Grand Slam gives preference over any kind of combination without a Grand Slam title);
 a singles > doubles > mixed doubles hierarchy;
 alphabetical order (by family names for players).

Key

Titles won by player

Titles won by nation

See also
 1973 World Championship Tennis circuit
 1973 Grand Prix tennis circuit

References

External links
Women's Tennis Association (WTA) official website
International Tennis Federation (ITF) official website

 
Virginia Slims WTA Tour
WTA Tour seasons